Albert Aslanovich Bogatyryov (born 14 June 1994) is a Russian football player.

Club career
He made his professional debut in the Russian Professional Football League for FC Mashuk-KMV Pyatigorsk on 10 April 2014 in a game against FC Krasnodar-2.

He made his Russian Football National League debut for PFC Spartak Nalchik on 11 July 2016 in a game against FC Kuban Krasnodar.

References

1994 births
People from Cherkessk
Living people
Russian footballers
Association football midfielders
CSF Bălți players
PFC Spartak Nalchik players
FC Tyumen players
FC Pyunik players
FC SKA Rostov-on-Don players
Russian expatriate footballers
Expatriate footballers in Moldova
Expatriate footballers in Armenia
Sportspeople from Karachay-Cherkessia
FC Mashuk-KMV Pyatigorsk players